The 1949–50 Challenge Cup was the 49th staging of rugby league's oldest knockout competition, the Challenge Cup.

First round

Second round

Quarterfinals

Semifinals

Final
Warrington beat Widnes 19–0 in the final played at Wembley in front of a crowd of 94,249. This was Warrington's third Cup final win in nine Final appearances. This was the second successive Final that the losing side had failed to score. The Warrington  Gerry Helme won the Lance Todd Trophy for man-of-the-match.

References

Challenge Cup
Challenge Cup